Ibram Xolani Kendi (born Ibram Henry Rogers, August 13, 1982) is an American author, professor, anti-racist activist, and historian of race and discriminatory policy in America. In July 2020, he assumed the position of director of the Center for Antiracist Research at Boston University.

Kendi was included in Time's 100 Most Influential People of 2020.

Early life and education
Kendi was born in the Jamaica neighborhood of the New York City borough of Queens, to middle-class parents, Carol Rogers, a former business analyst for a health-care organization, and Larry Rogers, a tax accountant and then hospital chaplain. Both of his parents are now retired and work as Methodist ministers. He has an older brother, Akil.

From third to eighth grade, Kendi attended private Christian schools in Queens. After attending John Bowne High School as a freshman, at age 15, Kendi moved with his family to Manassas, Virginia in 1997 and attended Stonewall Jackson High School for his final three years of high school, from which he graduated in 2000.

In 2005, Kendi received dual B.S. degrees in African American Studies and magazine production from Florida A&M University. In 2007, Kendi earned an M.A. and in 2010 a Ph.D. in African American Studies from Temple University. Kendi's dissertation was titled "The Black Campus Movement: An Afrocentric Narrative History of the Struggle to Diversify Higher Education, 1965-1972". His advisor was Ama Mazama.

Career

Teaching
From 2008 to 2012, Kendi was an assistant professor of history in the department of Africana and Latino Studies within the department of history at State University of New York at Oneonta. From 2012 to 2015, Kendi was an assistant professor of Africana Studies in the department of Africana Studies as well as the department of history at University at Albany, SUNY. During this time, from 2013 to 2014, Kendi was a visiting scholar in the department of Africana Studies at Brown University, where he taught courses as a visiting assistant professor in the fall of 2014.

From 2015 to 2017, Kendi was an assistant professor at the University of Florida history department's African American Studies program.

In 2017, Kendi became a professor of history and international relations at the College of Arts and Sciences (CAS) and School of International Service (SIS) at American University in Washington, D.C. In September 2017, Kendi founded the Antiracist Research and Policy Center at American University, serving as its executive director. In June 2020, it was announced that Kendi would join Boston University as a professor of history. Upon accepting the position, Kendi agreed to move the Antiracist Research and Policy Center at American University to Boston University, where he will serve as the founding director of the Boston University Center for Antiracist Research.

During the 2020–2021 academic year, Kendi served as the Frances B. Cashin Fellow at the Radcliffe Institute for Advanced Study at Harvard University.

Writing

Kendi has published essays in both books and academic journals, including The Journal of African American History, Journal of Social History, Journal of Black Studies, Journal of African American Studies, and The Sixties: A Journal of History, Politics and Culture. Kendi is also a contributing writer at The Atlantic.

He is the author of six books: 
The Black Campus Movement: Black Students and the Racial Reconstitution of Higher Education, 1965–1972
Stamped from the Beginning: The Definitive History of Racist Ideas in America
How to Be an Antiracist
STAMPED: Racism, Antiracism, and You
Antiracist Baby
 How to Raise an Antiracist

In 2016, Kendi won the National Book Award for Nonfiction for Stamped from the Beginning, which was published by Nation Books. He was the youngest author to ever win the prize. Titled after an 1860 speech given by Jefferson Davis at the U.S. Senate, the book builds around the stories of historical figures Cotton Mather, Thomas Jefferson, William Lloyd Garrison, and W.E.B. Du Bois, as well as the current figure, Angela Davis.

How to Be an Antiracist

A New York Times #1 Best Seller in 2020, How to Be an Antiracist is Kendi's most popular work thus far. Professor Jeffrey C. Stewart called it the "most courageous book to date on the problem of race in the Western mind". Afua Hirsch praised the book's introspection and wrote that it was relatable in the context of ongoing political events. In contrast, Andrew Sullivan wrote that the book's arguments were simplistic and criticized Kendi's idea of transferring government oversight to an unelected Department of Antiracism. Kelefa Sanneh noted Kendi's "sacred fervor" in battling racism, but wondered if his definition of racism was so capacious and outcome-dependent as to risk losing its power. John McWhorter criticized the book as being simple, and challenged Kendi's claim that all racial disparities are necessarily due to racism.

The Emancipator 

In 2021, he founded The Emancipator with Bina Venkataraman of The Boston Globe.

Honors and awards 
 2016: National Book Award for Nonfiction, Stamped from the Beginning: The Definitive History of Racist Ideas in America — National Book Foundation.
 2019: Guggenheim Fellowship, U.S. History — John Simon Guggenheim Memorial Foundation
 2019: 15th most influential African American between 25 and 45 years old according to The Root 100
 2020: Frances B. Cashin Fellowship, the Radcliffe Institute for Advanced Study — Harvard University
 2020: Time 100 list of Most Influential People
 2021: MacArthur Fellowship
 2021:  Museum of African American History Living Legends award - The Garrison Silver Cup.

Political commentary

Policy changes vs racism education

Kendi argues that policy outcomes are central in measuring and effecting racial equity. He has said, "All along we've been trying to change people, when we really need to change policies." When speaking in November 2020 to the Alliance for Early Success, Kendi was asked if that even means abiding racist behavior and attitudes if it leads to winning an antiracist policy. Kendi answered with a definitive yes. "I want things to change for millions of people – millions of children – as opposed to trying to change one individual person."

COVID-19 and George Floyd protests
On May 27, 2020, Kendi appeared before the United States House Committee on Ways and Means about the disproportionate impact of COVID-19 on African Americans, saying: "This is the racial pandemic within the viral pandemic".

Kendi has been a long-time outspoken critic of police killings of black men and women. In 2020, speaking to The New York Times after How to Be an Antiracist saw renewed interest during the George Floyd protests, Kendi called the mood in the United States during the protests "a signature, significant distinct moment of people striving to be antiracist".

Before the protests, Kendi published a proposal for a constitutional amendment in the U.S. to establish and fund the Department of Anti-Racism (DOA). This department would be responsible for "preclearing all local, state and federal public policies to ensure they won’t yield racial inequity, monitor those policies, investigate and be empowered with disciplinary tools to wield over and against policymakers and public officials who do not voluntarily change their racist policy and ideas".

Comments on Amy Coney Barrett's children
Kendi provoked controversy when he tweeted about Amy Coney Barrett, President Donald Trump's third Supreme Court nominee, and two of her seven children, who had been adopted from an orphanage in Haiti. Kendi said: Some White colonizers 'adopted' Black children. They 'civilized' these 'savage' children in the 'superior' ways of White people, while using them as props in their lifelong pictures of denial, while cutting the biological parents of these children out of the picture of humanity. And whether this is Barrett or not is not the point. It is a belief too many White people have: if they have or adopt a child of color, then they can't be racist. His remarks were interpreted as criticizing interracial adoption. A substantial backlash against Kendi ensued. He later said his comments were taken out of context and that he had never said that white parents of black children are inherently racist.

Personal life 

In 2013, Kendi married Sadiqa Edmonds Kendi, a pediatric emergency medicine physician, in Jamaica. Both sets of parents participated in a symbolic sand ceremony. The wedding ceremony ended with a naming ceremony of their new last name, "Kendi", which means "the loved one" in the language of the Meru people of Kenya. Kendi changed his middle name to Xolani, a Xhosa and Zulu word for "peace".

In January 2018, a colonoscopy indicated that Kendi had cancer. A further test revealed that he had stage 4 colon cancer that had spread into his liver. After six months of chemotherapy and surgery that summer, Kendi was declared cancer free.

Kendi has been a vegan since at least 2015.

Selected works and publications

Books
 2012. The Black Campus Movement: Black Students and the Racial Reconstitution of Higher Education, 1965-1972. New York: Palgrave Macmillan. . .
2016. Stamped from the Beginning: The Definitive History of Racist Ideas in America. New York: Nation Books. . . 
2019. How to Be An Antiracist. New York: One World. . .
 2020. STAMPED: Racism, Antiracism, and You, with Jason Reynolds. New York: Little, Brown and Company. . .
 2020. Antiracist Baby, illustrated by Ashley Lukashevsky. New York: Kokila. . .
 2021. Four Hundred Souls: A Community History of African America, 1619–2019, edited with Keisha N. Blain. New York: One World. . 
 2022. How to Raise an Antiracist. New York: One World. . .
 2022. Goodnight Racism. New York: Kokila. . .

Selected academic papers 

 2008. "Required Service-Learning Courses: A Disciplinary Necessity to Preserve the Decaying Social Mission of Black Studies" (as Ibram Rogers). Journal of Black Studies 40(6):1119–35. . .
2014. "Nationalizing Resistance: Race and New York in the 20th Century". New York History 95(4):537–42. . .
2018 July 15. "Black Doctoral Studies: The Radically Antiracist Idea of Molefi Kete Asante". Journal of Black Studies 49(6):542–58. . .
2019 December. "There is no such thing as race in health-care algorithms [PDF]". The Lancet Digital Health 1(8):e375. .

Selected publications 
 2016 January 22. "Reclaiming MLK's Unspeakable Nightmare: The Progression of Racism in America". Black Perspectives. African American Intellectual History Society (AAIHS). 
2016 April 8. "An Intellectual History of a Book Title: Stamped from the Beginning". Black Perspectives. AAIHS.
 2017 July 2. "Analysis: The Civil Rights Act was a victory against racism. But racists also won". The Washington Post.
 2017 November 13. "Perspective: Trump sounds ignorant of history. But racist ideas often masquerade as ignorance". The Washington Post.
 2018 January 13. "Opinion: The Heartbeat of Racism Is Denial". The New York Times.
 2018 December 6. "This is what an antiracist America would look like. How do we get there?". The Guardian.
 2019 January 10. "What I Learned From Cancer". The Atlantic.
 2019 June 19. "There Is No Middle Ground on Reparations". The Atlantic.
 2020 May 4. "We're Still Living and Dying in the Slaveholders' Republic". The Atlantic.
 2020 June 1. "The American Nightmare". The Atlantic.
 2021 July 9. "There Is No Debate Over Critical Race Theory". The Atlantic.

Video recordings
 2016 December 16. "Commencement Speech: Are you an intellectual?" University of Florida.
2018 February 8. "Prof. Ibram X. Kendi: Stamped From the Beginning: The Definitive History of Racist Ideas in America" [1:28:57]. National History Center, American Historical Association. via YouTube.
2018 May 18. "MLTalks: Ibram X. Kendi in conversation with Danielle Wood" [1:35:00]. MIT Media Labs. via YouTube.
2019 June 26. "How to be an Antiracist" [54:53]. Aspen Ideas Festival. Aspen, CO: The Aspen Institute. via YouTube.
2019 September 18. "Ibram X. Kendi on How to be an Antiracist, at UC Berkeley | #400Years" [2:04:29]. Othering & Belonging Institute, UC Berkeley. via YouTube.

References

External links

 
 BU Center for Antiracist Research at Boston University
 Ibram X. Kendi at The Atlantic
 
 

1982 births
Living people
21st-century American historians
21st-century American male writers
Black studies scholars
American anti-racism activists
American University faculty and staff
Brown University faculty
Florida A&M University alumni
Historians from New York (state)
Journalists from New York City
People from Jamaica, Queens
People from Manassas, Virginia
Temple University alumni
Writers from Queens, New York
Historians from Virginia
American male non-fiction writers
MacArthur Fellows